The 1973 NCAA University Division Swimming and Diving Championships were contested in March 1973 at the University of Tennessee Student Aquatic Center at the University of Tennessee in Knoxville, Tennessee at the 50th annual NCAA-sanctioned swim meet to determine the team and individual national champions of University Division men's collegiate swimming and diving in the United States.

Indiana again topped the team standings, the Hoosiers' sixth consecutive and sixth overall title.

Team standings
Note: Top 10 only
(H) = Hosts
(DC) = Defending champions
Full results

See also
List of college swimming and diving teams

References

NCAA Division I Men's Swimming and Diving Championships
NCAA University Division Swimming And Diving Championships
NCAA University Division Swimming And Diving Championships